Wilford is a hundred of Suffolk, consisting of .

Wilford Hundred extends about  southward from Debach to Woodbridge and from there along the eastern banks of the River Deben to Bawdsey and Hollesley Bay in the North Sea.

In the vale of the Deben between Wickham Market to Woodbridge and the sea it has some rich arable land but its central area around Sutton are sandy with open heaths. It is in the Deanery of Wilford in the Archdeaconry of Suffolk. Its only town of any size is Wickham Market.

Listed as Wileford in the Domesday Book, the exact meaning is not known but "Wili's ford" or "willow ford" are both possible.

Parishes

Wilford Hundred consists of the following 17 parishes:

References

Hundreds of Suffolk